Peddapalli–Nizamabad line is a single-track broad-gauge railway line in the Indian state of Telangana. It connects Nizamabad and Peddapalli in South Central Railway zone. It reduces the distance between Nizamabad, Karimnagar and Warangal. Peddapalli is located on Kazipet–Balharshah section of Delhi–Chennai line, known as Grand Trunk line and Nizamabad is located on Secunderabad–Manmad line.

History 
Peddapalli–Karimnagar–Nizamabad railway line (177 km) was sanctioned by the late Shri.P.V. Narasimha Rao who was the 10th Prime Minister of India in the year of 1993. It took 23 years to be completed in a phased manner.

The section between Peddapalli and Karimnagar was completed and train services were started in 2001. It took another 6 years to complete the stretch between Karimnagar and Jagityal and passenger trains were extended till Jagityal from 2007. On 29 December 2016 upon the completion of railway tracks between Jagityal and Mortad, the DEMU trains were further extended till Morthad mandal of Nizamabad district and passenger trains began moving between Karimnagar–Morthad and Peddapalli–Jagityal. After the fund allocation for the remaining section between Morthad and Nizamabad, the works were accelerated and within a year the Peddapalli–Nizamabad line via Karimnagar was ready for operations and the services began from 25 March 2017 and it took 3.5 years to electrify the complete line, started in 2018 oct and completed in feb 2022. The overall stretch took nearly 24 years in total to complete along with single electric line.

In the near future, passengers can link to this line once the Kothapalli-Manoharabad line is complete, via Kothapalli (Karimnagar).

Stations 
  (PDPL)
 Sultanabad (STBD)
  (KRMR)
 Kothapalli(haveli) (KPHI)
 Gangadhara (GDRA)
 Podur (PUDR)
 Mallial Nukapalli (NPML)
 Lingampet–Jagityal(LPJL)
 Medipalli (MDPLI)
  (KRLA)

 Metpally(MTPI)
 Mortad (MRTD)
 Anksapur (AKSP)
 Armoor (ARMR)
 Mamidipalle (MMDPL)
  (NZB)

Electrification 
Single line electrification is completed between Peddapalli and Lingampet Jagityal section (83 km) under Phase 1 Construction completed in March 2019. Phase 2 from Lingampet Jagityal till Nizamabad is under construction.

Markings are completed . Poles laying work started in 2020.

Morthad to Nizamabad Electrification CRS is done on 24th of February, 2022 which is 45 kms distance, with this, Peddapalli - Nizamabad Railway Line Section is single electrified line which is 177 kms distance.

Passenger trains 

 Tirupati–Karimnagar–Tirupati Biweekly SF Express (12791/12792)
 Kacheguda–Peddapalli Junction–Kacheguda DEMU Express Special (07793/07794)
 Karimnagar–Sirpur Town–Karimnagar MEMU Express Special (07765/07766)

 Nizamabad–Karimnagar–Nizamabad MEMU Express Special (07893/07894)
 Dadar Central–Kazipet Junction–Dadar Central Special Fare Special Express (07195/07196)

References

External links 
Peddapalli-Karimnagar-Nizamabad S L Project
Peddapalli-Karimnagar Railway line commissioned

Nizamabad, Telangana
South Central Railway zone
5 ft 6 in gauge railways in India
Rail transport in Telangana